Paloemeu River or Palumeu River is a river in the Sipaliwini District of Suriname. It joins the Tapanahony River at the village of Paloemeu.

See also
List of rivers of Suriname

References
Rand McNally, The New International Atlas, 1993.

Rivers of Suriname